Evergreen is a Christmas album by American banjoist Alison Brown, released in 2008. 

Arranged in a jazzy style, the album features fiddler/mandolinists Joe Craven and is often compared with similar Christmas album effort by Béla Fleck and the Flecktones, Jingle All the Way.

Reception 

In his Allmusic review, music critic Rick Anderson wrote "No one who likes Christmas music will be able to resist the charms of this album."

Track listing 
 "Carol and the Kings: Carol of the Bells/We Three Kings" (Traditional) – 5:10
 "Sleigh Ride" (Anderson, Parish) – 3:43
 "Two Santas: Here Comes Santa Claus/Santa Claus Is Coming to Town" (Autry, Coots, Gillespie) – 4:32
 "Christmas Don't Be Late" (Bagdasarian) – 3:34
 "O'Carolan's/Welcome Christmas: O'Carolan's Farewell/Welcome Christmas" (Geisel, Hague, O'Carolan) – 3:38
 "Skating/Feliz Navidad" (Guaraldi, trad.) – 4:12
 "Silver Bells" (Evans, Livingston) – 3:59
 "Let It Snow! Let It Snow! Let It Snow!" (Cahn, Styne) – 3:20
 "Christmas Time is Here" (Guaraldi, Mendelson) – 4:01
 "The Little Drummer Boy" (Davis) – 4:13
 "Christmas Don't Be Late (reprise)" (Bagdasarian) – 1:02

Personnel
 Alison Brown – banjo, guitar
 Larry Atamanuik – drums
 John Burr – piano
 Joe Craven – fiddle, mandolin, percussion
 Gary West – bass

References

Alison Brown albums
2008 Christmas albums
Christmas albums by American artists
Compass Records albums
Jazz Christmas albums